Rock Bridge Memorial State Park is a geological preserve and public recreation area encompassing ,  south of Columbia in Boone County, Missouri off of Missouri Route 163.

The park is home to 12 caves.

The state park is noted for its excellent examples of karst landforms including the rock bridge, sinkholes, and an underground stream at the cave known as Devil's Icebox. The rock bridge was created by the collapse of a section of a cave which resulted in a small arch of rock being left to form a natural bridge over the creek. The park is the only known home of Kenkia glandulosa, more commonly known as the pink planarian.

History 

In 1834, the first paper mill west of the Mississippi River was built at the site, then a whiskey distillery was built in 1847.

In 1967 the state park opened.

Activities and amenities
The boardwalk on the Devil's Icebox Trail gives access to the park's primary karst features and the opening at Connor's Cave. Park trails are available for hiking and cycling, and horseback riding is offered in the  Gans Creek Wild Area.

See also
Three Creeks Conservation Area
Gans Creek Recreation Area

References

External links

Rock Bridge Memorial State Park Missouri Department of Natural Resources 
Rock Bridge Memorial State Park Map Missouri Department of Natural Resources

State parks of Missouri
Protected areas of Boone County, Missouri
Landforms of Boone County, Missouri
Protected areas established in 1967
Parks in Columbia, Missouri